Calcium-binding protein 39 is a protein that in humans is encoded by the CAB39 gene.

The protein encoded by this gene associates with STK11 (Serine/Threonine Kinase 11) and STRAD (STE20-Related ADaptor protein). CAB39 enhances formation of STK11/STRAD complexes and stimulates STK11 catalytic activity.  CAB39 may function as a scaffolding component of the STK11/STRAD complex and regulates STK11 activity and cellular localization.

References

External links

Further reading